Dapodi is a neighborhood in the city of Pune, India. It is located in the northwest area of the city. Dapodi is situated on the banks of Pavana river and Mula River.

The neighbourhood lies on National Highway 48 (India). It is served by Dapodi railway station which falls on Mumbai–Chennai line. The railway station opened in 1858.

Earlier a small village, Dapodi has been transformed into an urban area. Area such Fugewadi (Phugewadi) and Kundan Nagar comes under Dapodi area (Post Code-411012).

Government establishments

College of Military Engineering, Pune
MSRTC Central Workshop (S.T. Workshop)
Irrigation Department Mechanical Workshop

Schools
Kendriya Vidyalay CME
St Mary's Convent Preschool
Hutatma Bhagat Singh High School
Swami Vivekananda Vidyamandir and Junior College

Banks
Bank Of Maharashtra
union bank of india
Axis Bank
Pune District Central Co. Op. Bank
State Transprt Co-operative Bank
Pavana Sahakari Bank

Religious places
Datt Mandir
Ganesh Mandir
Mata Shitaladevi Mandir
Firangai Devi Mandir
Maruti Mandir
Vithoba Mandir
Jain Mandir
Bauddha Vihar (Trailokya Bauddha Mahasangha Bauddha Vihara)
9 Vineyard Workers Church(peter silway)

10 Salvation Army Church

11 Holy cross Church (Catholic)
Jama Masjid
12 Tayyab Masjid (Ahle sunnat Wal Jamaat Deobandi)

Location
The surrounding areas are: Bopodi, Bopkhel, Kalas, Kasarwadi, Pimple Gurav and Sangvi.

References

Neighbourhoods in Pimpri-Chinchwad